Francesco "Franco" Giordano (born 26 August 1957) is an Italian politician.

Born in Bari, he became a member of the Italian Communist Party in 1974. From 1985 to 1987 he was member of the national leadership of Federation of Young Italian Communists, and, from 1987 to 1991, of the local PCI leadership of the province of Bari. When the latter was turned into the more social democratic-oriented Democratic Party of the Left, Giordano moved to the Communist Refoundation Party (PRC).

In 1992 Giordano became a national leader of PRC and, in 1996, he was elected for the first time at the Italian Chamber of Deputies. His seat was confirmed in the 2001 and 2006 elections.

President of PRC's group of deputies from October 1998, he was named vice-secretary of the party in 2001 by Fausto Bertinotti. After the latter's election as President of the Italian Chamber of Deputies, Giordano became national secretary of PRC on 7 May 2006.

References 

1957 births
Living people
Italian Communist Party politicians
20th-century Italian politicians
Communist Refoundation Party politicians
People from Bari